Interleukin 8 receptor, alpha is a chemokine receptor. This name and the corresponding gene symbol IL8RA have been replaced by the HGNC approved name C-X-C motif chemokine receptor 1 and the approved symbol CXCR1. It has also been designated as CD181 (cluster of differentiation 181). The IUPHAR Committee on Receptor Nomenclature and Drug Classification use the HGNC recommended name, CXCR1.

Function 

The protein encoded by this gene is a member of the G-protein-coupled receptor family. This protein is a receptor for interleukin 8 (IL8). It binds to IL8 with high affinity, and transduces the signal through a G-protein-activated second messenger system. Knockout studies in mice suggested that this protein inhibits embryonic oligodendrocyte precursor migration in developing spinal cord. IL8RA, IL8RB, which encodes another high affinity IL8 receptor, and IL8RBP, a pseudogene of IL8RB, form a gene cluster in a region mapped to chromosome 2q33-q36. Stimulation of CXCR1 in neutrophils by its primary ligand, Interleukin 8, leads to neutrophil chemotaxis and activation.

Clinical significance 

Blocking CXCR1 (e.g., with repertaxin) inhibits some human breast cancer stem cells (in vitro and in mice).

In malignant melanoma expression of CXCR1 at the cell surface is present, independent of the cancers stage. It is thought to have a role in the cell growth and angiogenesis required for tumour survival. In this way it has been identified as a potential therapeutic target.

CXCR1 can be cleaved and inactivated by Neutrophil Derived Serine Proteases (NSPs), leading to neutrophil dysfunction and impaired bacterial killing in cystic fibrosis lung disease.

Interactions 

Interleukin 8 receptor, alpha has been shown to interact with GNAI2.

See also 
 Interleukin
 Interleukin 8
 Interleukin 8 receptor, beta
 Interleukin receptor
 Interleukin-8 receptor

References

Further reading

External links 

Clusters of differentiation
Chemokine receptors